Formidabile was the lead ship of the  ironclad warships, the first ships of that type to be built for the newly formed Italian Regia Marina (Royal Navy). Formidabile and her sister, were both built in France; Formidabile was laid down in December 1860, was launched in October 1861, and was completed in May 1862. She was a broadside ironclad, equipped with four  and sixteen  guns.

The ship took part in the operation off Lissa in 1866 during the Third Italian War of Independence. There, she silenced the Austrian coastal batteries protecting the main port, but she was too badly damaged to take part in the ensuing Battle of Lissa. The ship's postwar career was limited due to a combination of drastically reduced naval budgets and the appearance of more modern ironclads. Formidabile was used as a training ship starting in 1887; she was discarded in 1903 and broken up for scrap.

Design

She had a crew of 371. Her propulsion system consisted of one single-expansion marine steam engine that drove a single screw propeller, with steam supplied by six coal-fired, rectangular fire-tube boilers. The boilers were vented through a single funnel. To supplement her steam engine, the ship was schooner-rigged.

Formidabile was a broadside ironclad, carrying all of her guns in the traditional broadside arrangement. She was armed with a main battery of four  guns and sixteen  rifled muzzle-loading guns.

Service history

Formidabile was laid down at the Société Nouvelle des Forges et Chantiers de la Méditerranée shipyard in La Seyne, France in December 1860, originally ordered by the Royal Sardinian Navy. She was launched on 1 October 1861 and was completed in May 1862; by this time, the Sardinian fleet had been reformed as the Regia Marina (Royal Navy) of the newly unified Kingdom of Italy. In June 1866, Italy declared war on Austria, as part of the Third Italian War of Independence, which was fought concurrently with the Austro-Prussian War. The Italian fleet commander, Admiral Carlo Pellion di Persano, initially adopted a cautious course of action; he was unwilling to risk battle with the Austrian Navy, despite the fact that the Austrian fleet was much weaker than his own. Persano claimed he was simply waiting on the ironclad ram , en route from Britain, but his inaction weakened morale in the fleet, with many of his subordinates openly accusing him of cowardice.

Rear Admiral Wilhelm von Tegetthoff brought the Austrian fleet to Ancona on 27 June, in attempt to draw out the Italians. Persano held a council of war aboard the ironclad  to determine whether he should sortie to engage Tegetthoff, but by that time, the Austrians had withdrawn, making the decision moot. The Minister of the Navy, Agostino Depretis, urged Persano to act and suggested he capture the island of Lissa, to restore Italian confidence after their defeat at the Battle of Custoza the previous month. On 7 July, Persano left Ancona and conducted a sweep into the Adriatic, but encountered no Austrian ships and returned on the 13th.

Battle of Lissa

On 16 July, Persano took the Italian fleet out of Ancona, bound for Lissa, where they arrived on the 18th. With them, they brought troop transports carrying 3,000 soldiers; the Italian warships began bombarding the Austrian forts on the island, with the intention of landing the soldiers once the fortresses had been silenced. In response, the Austrian Navy sent the fleet under Tegetthoff to attack the Italian ships. After spending the 18th unsuccessfully bombarding the Austrian fortresses, the Italians withdrew late in the day, preparing to launch another attack the following morning.

Upon entering the small harbor, the Italians found it impossible for the four ships to attack simultaneously, and so Formidabile was left to engage the Madonna battery alone. Following the conclusion of the bombardment, the ship's captain, Simone Antonio Saint-Bon, reported to Persano that his ship had suffered over 50 casualties, and it had been significantly damaged by Austrian fire, though its armor had not been penetrated. Saint-Bon took his battered ship to the west, where he transferred his wounded to a hospital ship. The following day, while Formidabile was with the hospital ship, the Austrian fleet under Tegetthoff appeared. Persano had ordered Formidabile to return to the line, but Saint-Bon informed Persano that his ship was unable to fight, and instead he withdrew to Ancona. The Italians were defeated in the ensuing battle, with the ironclads  and  sunk.

Later career
After the battle, Persano was replaced by Admiral Giovanni Vacca; he was ordered to attack the main Austrian naval base at Pola, but the war ended before the operation could be carried out. After the end of the war, the government lost confidence in the fleet and drastically reduced the naval budget. The cuts were so severe that the fleet had great difficulty in mobilizing its ironclad squadron to attack the port of Civitavecchia in September 1870, as part of the wars of Italian unification. Instead, the ships were laid up and the sailors conscripted to man them were sent home. In addition, Formidabile was rapidly surpassed, first by central battery and then turret ships, which made the first generation of ironclads like Formidabile and her sister obsolete. In 1872–1873, the ship received new boilers. Her armament was significantly reduced in 1878 to eight 8-inch guns. In 1887, the ship was withdrawn from front-line service and was thereafter employed as a gunnery training ship. At this time, her armament was reduced to six  guns. She served in this capacity until 1903, when she was stricken from the naval register and subsequently broken up for scrap.

Notes

References

External links
 Formidabile Marina Militare website 

Formidabile
1861 ships